Lysovychi  is a village in Stryi Raion, Lviv Oblast in western Ukraine. It belongs to Morshyn urban hromada, one of the hromadas of Ukraine.
Local government is administered by Lysovytska village council. 
The population of the village is about 1770 people.

Geography 

History 
The first written mention dates back to year 1702. According to other sources Lysovychi were first mentioned in written sources in 1371. During the First World War, the village was the scene of fierce fighting, the ground was burned, crops destroyed.

Monuments of architecture 
The village has two sights of architecture Stryi district:
 Epiphany church (Bohoyavlenska tserkva) 1712 (525/1-М).
 Bell tower of Epiphany church (Dzvinytsya Bohoyavlenskoyi tserkvy) (19th century) (525/2-М).

Personalities 
 Boris Joseph Ivanovych — regional leader of the Stryj OUN in 1947–48.
 Bukshovanyy Osyp Ivanovych — May 29, 1915 he was wounded and was taken prisoner up to Russia.

References

External links 
 Geographical Names, Lysovychi: Ukraine
 E n c y c l o p e d i a o f S i g h t s, Stryi district » Lysovychi
 weather.in.ua
 Богоявленська церква та дзвіниця, с. Лисовичі.

Literature 
  History of Towns and Villages of the Ukrainian SSR, Lvov region. – Київ : ГРУРЕ, 1968 р., 834 стор.

Villages in Stryi Raion